Audiomachine is an American production music company based in Beverly Hills, California. The company was founded by Paul Dinletir and Carol Sovinski in August 2005, producing music composed by Paul Dinletir and Kevin Rix.

About the company 

Audiomachine mainly produces music for movie trailers and advertisements, but recently its music has also been featured in the 2010, 2012 and 2014 Olympic games official program labeled as Epic Music.

Many of Audiomachine's tracks have been featured in theatrical movie trailers, including those of Avatar, The Chronicles of Narnia films, Iron Man,  Venom, Avengers: Endgame, Dune, and others.

Originally, Audiomachine released albums only for the film industry's professional use, but since 2012 it has released selected albums and compilations for the general public as well. The industry-released albums include Deus Ex Machina, Phenomena, Origins, Leviathan, Awakenings, Millennium, and Monolith.

Composers

Paul Dinletir 
Paul Dinletir initially just played piano and wanted to be a songwriter and jazz pianist. His wife was able to get him into a film and television music UCLA taught by Robert Etoll, who is now a collaborator. This led to him becoming a composer for X-Ray Dog where he composed trailers for cartoons (such as Samurai Jack until season 4) and reality TV shows; from that he saw the enjoyment he got from trailer music and eventually did that full time. Dinletir's influences are Mozart, Beethoven, Debussy; he regularly listens to soundtracks. He used Logic Pro software for 15 years and switched to Steinberg Cubase.

Kevin Rix 
Kevin Rix started out playing guitar and was in various rock bands growing up. At music school, where he was introduced to classical music and jazz, he started realizing his interests in composing and in working with different instruments and sounds. After a few years he decided to do it professionally. At first he wanted to get into writing film soundtracks. While he was working on a demo reel, he obtained a job editing and mixing ringtones for a company, where he met Dinletir. He started in the profession as Dinletir's assistant doing sound design. Rix's influences include Mozart, Bach, Debussy, Rush, Mastodon, Soundgarden, Hans Zimmer, and Harry Gregson-Williams.

Placements 
Along with Harry Gregson-Williams, Audiomachine is responsible for the soundtrack of the 2014 video game, Call of Duty: Advanced Warfare, the first game in the Call of Duty series to be developed by Sledgehammer Games.

Music from its albums was used in:
 Trailers, teasers for movies: Hancock, Fantastic Four: Rise of the Silver Surfer, Harry Potter and the Order of the Phoenix, Kung Fu Panda, Spider-Man 3, Transformers, Angels & Demons, Venom, Avatar, Hellboy II: The Golden Army, Hugo, I Am Legend, Live Free or Die Hard, Pride and Glory, Prometheus, Rise of the Guardians, The Hobbit: An Unexpected Journey, The Hobbit: The Desolation of Smaug, Up, Thor: The Dark World, Noah, Exodus: Gods and Kings, How to Train Your Dragon 2, Inkheart, Blood Diamond, The Prestige, Beauty and the Beast, Hidden Figures, Rogue One, A Cure for Wellness, The Lost City of Z, Spider-Man: Homecoming, Split, Monster Trucks, Storks, Fantastic Beasts and Where to Find Them, Miss Peregrine's Home for Peculiar Children, The Martian, Avengers: Infinity War, Christopher Robin, Avengers: Endgame, Frozen 2. and Black Widow.
 Trailers, teasers for TV series: iBoy, Prison Break, Game of Thrones, Westworld, Voltron: Legendary Defender, The Last Kingdom,
 Others:
 The track "Carpe Diem" from album Magnus: B Sides was used in the highlight clip Porsche's win of the FIA WEC 2016.  Also, "An Unfinished Life" from album Tree of Life was used in the clip Porsche Le Mans 2016.
 "Warland's Fury," "The Lion's Heart" and "Voyage of Dreams" from the public release Decimus were featured in the NBC's 2016 Summer Olympics Opening Montage.
 "Gathering of the Clans" was featured throughout the entire opening montage of the 88th Academy Awards broadcasts.
 "Akkadian Empire" was used in the launch trailer of StarCraft II: Wings of Liberty.
 "The Final Hour" from the album Magnus was used in the credits of Channel 4 SAS: Who Dares Wins Series 3.
 "Eternal Flame" from Epica was used in the final video of the 2016 convention of Jehovah's Witnesses - Jehovah Will Treat His Loyal One in a Special Way.
 "Dauntless" was featured in the Mass Effect Legendary Edition reveal trailer.

Discography

Studio albums

Remix albums

Studio Series

Compilation albums

Singles and EPs

Soundtracks

References

External links 
 
 Audiomachine discography at Discogs
 Audiomachine discography at MusicBrainz
 Audiomachine at AllMusic

Music production companies
Entertainment companies based in California
Companies based in Los Angeles
Entertainment companies established in 2005
2005 establishments in California